Think Pink is the 1970 debut album (recorded 1969) by English psychedelic musician Twink. It was produced by Mick Farren and featured members of The Pretty Things, The Deviants, plus Steve Peregrin Took of Tyrannosaurus Rex. It was released on Sire Records in the US in 1970 and Polydor Records in the UK in early 1971 (as a warm-up for the release of the Pink Fairies' debut album Never Never Land.)  The final two tracks were the only commercial release of any songs written by Took until 1990, ten years after his death.

The track "Fluid" was sampled by Gnarls Barkley on their track "Would Be Killer" from the hit album The Odd Couple and Tyler, the Creator on the track “Boyfriend” from the physical release of his album Igor.

Track listing
All songs written by Twink, except where noted.

Side one
"The Coming of the One" – 3:39
"Ten Thousand Words in a Cardboard Box" (Twink, Junior) – 4:29
"Dawn of Magic" – 1:44
"Tiptoe on the Highest Hill" – 5:18
"Fluid" – 4:03

Side two
"Mexican Grass War" – 5:28
"Rock an' Roll the Joint" – 2:29
"Suicide" – 4:23
"Three Little Piggies" (Steve Took, Twink) – 3:12
"The Sparrow Is a Sign" (Took, Twink) – 2:22

Personnel
Twink – vocals; drums (tracks #1-2,4-5,7-10); acoustic guitar (track #8)
Wally Allen – piano (#5)
Mick Farren – vocals (#7); producer
Dave "Boss" Goodman – vocals, percussion (#9)
John "Honk" Lodge– bass guitar (#5,7)
John Povey – sitar (#1), mellotron (#2,4,8)
Viv Prince – drums (#6)
Paul Rudolph – acoustic & electric guitars (#2,4-8,10); vibraphone (#8); vocals (#9); percussion (#9); bass guitar (#10); chimes (#10)
Silver – vocals (#5,7,9); percussion (#9)
Steve Peregrin Took – pixie horn (#1); vocals (#1,9,10); percussion (#6,7,9); acoustic guitar (#10) 
Victor Unitt - electric guitars (#5,7)
John "Junior" Wood – bass guitar (#2,4,8)

References

External links
AllMusic Review of Think Pink
Amazon.co.uk page for Think Pink

Twink (musician) albums
1970 albums
Polydor Records albums
Sire Records albums
Albums with cover art by Hipgnosis